Josef Karl Hans Aniol (12 June 1878 – 12 November 1945) was a German swimmer. A member of the Berliner Swimming Club Otter (SC Otter), he competed in the men's underwater swimming event and the water polo at the 1900 Summer Olympics. 

In the swimming competition, Aniol finished sixth; it was the only time the event was ever held. The water polo team that lost 2-3 to France had been put together at short notice by Georg Hax, their captain, and the team entered for the Olympics would form the basis of the future German national team.

References

External links
 

1878 births
1945 deaths
German male swimmers
Olympic swimmers of Germany
Olympic water polo players of Germany
Swimmers at the 1900 Summer Olympics
Water polo players at the 1900 Summer Olympics
Swimmers from Berlin
Water polo players from Berlin